Czech Association of Bandy (Czech: Česká Asociace Bandy) is the governing body for bandy and rink bandy in the Czech Republic. The association was founded in 2013 and became a member of the Federation of International Bandy in 2014.

The Czech Republic national bandy team is controlled by the association.

References

External links
 Czech Bandy at Facebook

Federation of International Bandy members
Bandy governing bodies
Bandy
Bandy in the Czech Republic
Sports organizations established in 2013
2013 establishments in the Czech Republic